Chandi Bhanjyang is a village development committee in Chitwan District in Bagmati Province of southern Nepal. At the time of the 2011 Nepal census it had a population of 4,978 people (2,460 male; 2,518 female) living in 487 individual households.

References

Populated places in Chitwan District